A materials test reactor (MTR) is a high power research nuclear reactor.

Examples
Materials testing reactors include:
 The  Materials Testing Reactor (MTR), an early reactor that operated in Idaho from 1952-1970.
Dounreay Materials Testing Reactor, a Dido class reactor in the United Kingdom.
ETRR-2, at the Nuclear Research Center in Inshas, Egypt.
Jules Horowitz Reactor, under construction at the Cadarache nuclear facility in southern France.
Research reactor in Petten, the Netherlands. 
PINSTECH National Laboratory (PNL) in Pakistan.
Reactor Technology Complex of the Idaho National Laboratory in Idaho, United States.
RV-1 nuclear reactor in Venezuelan Institute for Scientific Research, Venezuela
SAFARI-1, outside of Pretoria, South Africa, also used to produce medical isotopes.

See also
List of nuclear reactors

External links
Ne.anl.gov: MTR Reactors designed by the Argonne National Laboratory
Docs.google.com: Materials Testing Reactor

M
Nuclear technology in France
Nuclear technology in Pakistan
Nuclear technology in South Africa
Nuclear technology in the United States
Nuclear technology in Egypt